The 2009–10 season is Real Valladolid's third consecutive season in La Liga. José Luis Mendilibar began the season as team's coach, but he was sacked on 1 February 2010 after the draw against Almería. Onésimo Sánchez became the new team coach and, after the defeat against Villarreal in Nuevo José Zorrilla, he was also sacked on 5 April. The directive discovered on 6 April the new team coach, Javier Clemente.

Trophies balance

Summer transfers

In

Out

Loan in

Loan return

Loan end

Loan out

Winter transfers

In

Out

Loan in

Youth system

Current squad

CAN 2010 called players

U-19 national team called players

Match results
All times are in CET/CEST

Pre-season and friendly tournaments

Friendly matches

14th Quinocho Memorial Trophy

2009 Teresa Rivero Trophy

37th Ciudad de Valladolid Trophy

Copa Castilla y León 2009–10

The final of this tournament had to be played on April 23, 2010, the Castilla y León's day, but as both finalists had some problems in their leagues (Real Valladolid in Liga BBVA, finally relegated, and UD Salamanca in Liga Adelante), the final was postponed to the 2010–11 season.

Liga BBVA

With José Luis Mendilibar

With Onésimo Sánchez

With Javier Clemente

Copa del Rey

Round of 32

First leg

Second leg 

Real Valladolid 2–2 RCD Mallorca on aggregate. RCD Mallorca won on away goals.

Others

Polemic game against Real Madrid 

From the end of this match, the national press was fed by Real Valladolid. They accused it of violent and aggressive because of the badly referee's performance and the unfortunate foul committed by Nivaldo on Cristiano Ronaldo. Onésimo Sánchez, the press of Valladolid, Carlos Suárez and some Real Valladolid players were defending themselves saying that the match was not violent and that the referee's performance was wrong because of the non-signposting of two penalties (both of them committed by Sergio Ramos, booked at the 20th minute) to its favour and not by not send off any Valladolid player.
A sector of Valladolid press assured to have seen Jorge Valdano, Real Madrid's general manager, to take to Mejuto González and his assistants at the half time of the match two black sport bags which content could not be revealed.

Llanes deal
It's a supposed deal emerged because of the speculation between the supporters of Sporting Gijón and Racing Santander, twinned from some years ago. It consists in tampering Liga BBVA's last matchday with a double target: if Sporting Gijón loses (mathematically saved for the relegation), Racing Santander will win 3 points which will save the Miguel Ángel Portugal's team, harming and making more difficult the non-relegation for one of the most hated teams in Gijón: Real Valladolid.
Obviously, presidents, coaches and players from both teams gradually denied this speculation, but the Spanish press continues speculating and encouraging this rumor.
The name was invented by a sportswriter who noticed the table situation. Called Llanes deal because Llanes is a village between Asturias and Cantabria, autonomous communities in which Gijón and Santander are located.

Situation after the matchday 37:

...

Matchday 38:

Battle for the non-relegation
According to the course of the season, the calculations indicate that with 40 points or more, the teams will not be relegated to Liga Adelante, so that, assuming Sporting Gijón and UD Almería are now saved (both with 37 points in the 30th matchday), the teams involved in the fight for non-relegation, waiting yet for several face-to-face between the teams involved, are the follows, including Real Valladolid:

Real Valladolid's goal averages

League table

References
1: Álvaro Antón returned to the club as a loan return from Numancia, but the management decided to loan him again to Recreativo Huelva.

2: Neutral venue.

3: César Arzo scored the goal, but the referee César Muñiz Fernández notified in the report that the author had been Haris Medunjanin, so, in the Liga BBVA's official account, the goal was scored by Medunjanin.

4: The team that wins this variable will be qualified ahead of another with the same points but lost on goal average. If the goal average is drawn between two or more teams and, at the end of the season these teams have the same points, the overall Liga BBVA's goal average prevails over this goal average.

5: Separated of the team and made a file by the directive because of have been seen in some night clubs in Salamanca after team's defeats from April 1, 2010 to the end of the season.

6: Returns on April 21 because of the Eyjafjallajökull eruption.

2009-10
Spanish football clubs 2009–10 season